Holhoto (also, Helto) is a former Maidu settlement in Butte County, California. It was located a few miles south of Mooretown, California (now Feather Falls); its precise location is unknown.

See also
 Mooretown Rancheria of Maidu Indians

References

Former settlements in Butte County, California
Former Native American populated places in California
Maidu villages
Lost Native American populated places in the United States